Liu Jun (born 9 November 1968) is a male singles badminton player from China.

Career 
He come from Jiangxi, China and joined the national team in 1987. Liu won the All England men's singles crown in 1992. He also participated in the 1991 and 1993 World Championships, the 1992 Olympic Games and the 1992 and 1994 Thomas Cup during his career. Liu left the national team in 1994.

Achievements

World Championships 
Men's singles

World Cup 
Men's singles

Asian Championships 
Men's singles

East Asian Games 
Men's singles

IBF World Grand Prix 
The World Badminton Grand Prix sanctioned by International Badminton Federation (IBF) from 1983 to 2006.

Men's singles

References

1968 births
Living people
Olympic badminton players of China
Badminton players at the 1992 Summer Olympics
Chinese male badminton players
Badminton players from Jiangxi
20th-century Chinese people